Bursina nobilis, common name the noble frog shell, is a species of sea snail, a marine gastropod mollusc in the family Bursidae, the frog shells.

Description
The length of the shell varies between 25 mm and 113 mm.

Distribution
This marine species occurs off Mozambique and the Philippines.

References

 Drivas, J. & M. Jay (1988). Coquillages de La Réunion et de l'île Maurice.

External links
 

Bursidae
Gastropods described in 1844